Cui Yi or Yi Cui may refer to:

 Cui Yi (general), Chinese general
 Yi Cui (scientist), Chinese-American scientist